Mount Ruth is a ridge-shaped mountain, 2,170 m, standing 3 nautical miles (6 km) west of Mount Gardiner, at the southeast side of the lower reaches of Bartlett Glacier, in the Queen Maud Mountains. Discovered in December 1934 by the Byrd Antarctic Expedition geological party under Quin Blackburn, and named at that time by R. Admiral Byrd for Ruth Black, deceased wife of Richard B. Black, expedition member who assisted with seismic, survey, and radio operations in the vicinity of Little America II.
 

Mountains of the Ross Dependency
Amundsen Coast